Isabella Pajardi (born 24 January 1989) is an Italian former competitive ice dancer. She started skating at age four and was a single skater until 2000 when she began ice dancing with Stefano Caruso. They are the 2008 Italian junior national champions and placed 9th at the 2008 World Junior Championships.

Programs 
(with Caruso)

Competitive highlights
(with Caruso)

GP = Grand Prix; JGP = Junior Grand Prix

References

External links

 

Italian female ice dancers
1989 births
Living people
Figure skaters from Milan
Competitors at the 2009 Winter Universiade
20th-century Italian women
21st-century Italian women